The White Truck (French: Le camion blanc) is a 1943 French comedy drama film directed by Léo Joannon and starring Jules Berry, Blanchette Brunoy and François Périer.

The film's sets were designed by the art director Jean Douarinou.

Plot
A young garage mechanic is hired for an unusual assignment, to drive a white truck around France carrying the corpse of a famed gypsy leader.

Cast
Jules Berry as Shabbas - the chief of the northern gypsies
Blanchette Brunoy as Germaine
François Périer as François Ledru - a young mechanic
Fernand Charpin as Courbassié - gypsies' southern ambassador
Marguerite Moreno as The King's Widow
Roger Karl as Acho
Mila Parély as Madame Dupont
Jean Parédès as Ernest
Marcelle Monthil as Germaine's mother
Charles Lemontier as Germaine's father
Edmond Beauchamp as gypsy
Robert Berri as pump attendant
Georges Bever as ticket inspector

References

External links

1943 comedy-drama films
French comedy-drama films
Films directed by Léo Joannon
Pathé films
1940s French-language films
1940s French films